Akkışla is a town and district of Kayseri Province in the Central Anatolia region of Turkey. According to 2000 census, population of the district is 9,864 of which 3,265 live in the town of Akkışla.

See also
Gömürgen

Notes

References

External links
 District governor's official website 
 District municipality's official website 

Populated places in Kayseri Province
Districts of Kayseri Province
Towns in Turkey